Qobadlu (also Romanized as Qobādlū) is a village in Dizajrud-e Gharbi Rural District, in the Central District of Ajab Shir County, East Azerbaijan Province, Iran. At the 2006 census, its population was 330, in 76 families.

References 

Populated places in Ajab Shir County